Ahli Fiqir was a Singaporean hip hop group consisting of Samsolnahar Sibengat (Tukang Kata), Fadali Mohd Darif (Daly Filsuf), Noor Hidayati Mohamed Yusop (Mawar Berduri) and Ceza Mutyara (DJ Cza). The group, whose career spanned 8 years and widely known in Singapore and Malaysia, known for preserving the Malay language into their music, and has several hit singles including "Samseng", "Angguk-Angguk, Geleng-Geleng", "Tik Tok Simpati", "2x5", "Dia Datang" and "Derita Merindu". Ahli Fiqir disbanded in 2010.

History
Ahli Fiqir established in 2002 initially consisted of 3 original members - Fadali Mohd Darif (Daly Ahlifiqir; later known as Daly Filsuf), Samsolnahar Sibengat (Tukang Kata) and Noor Hidayati Mohamed Yusop (Mawar Berduri). The group itself was named after one of its members, Daly's stage name. Shortly after the group's formation, Ceza Mutyara or DJ Cza joined them, completing the group as a quartet. In 2005, Ahli Fiqir released their first single, "Samseng", followed by their debut album, Hari Ini Dalam Sejarah. In 2006, the group won Best Singaporean Artist at the 2006 Anugerah Planet Muzik while their debut album won the Best Singaporean Album.

A year later, their second album, Rap Untuk Rakyat was released in mid-2007, two singles were released for the album. In 2008, Ahli Fiqir alongside Pop Shuvit (Malaysia), Saint Loco (Indonesia), Thaitanium, Silksounds and M.E.M. (all from Thailand) and Slapshock (Philippines) formed the supergroup known as Project E.A.R. (Project East Asian Revolution), a collective consists of Southeast Asian musicians. The group later released their debut and only EP, Irama Berima in 2009, this time without Tukang Kata who left due to other commitments, Ahli Fiqir then continued as a trio. In April 2010, the group announced that they had officially disbanded. However, in 2012, the group reunited for short period to perform at the special concert to thanking their fans who supported them for years. The group has since gone indefinite hiatus as all of its members concentrated on their respective personal lives and careers.

Discography

Studio albums

Extended play

Singles

Other appearances

Awards and nominations

References

External links
 
 
 

Singaporean hip hop groups
Malaysian hip hop groups
Musical groups established in 2002
Musical groups disestablished in 2010